is the twenty-third single by Japanese pop band Exile. It was released on February 14, 2007 and was limited to 100,000 copies. The song has been certified as being downloaded more than 1,000,000 times as a ringtone by the RIAJ, and more than 250,000 times as a full-length download to cellphones.

Track listing

CD 
  – 4:40
 "Michi -Piano Version-" – 4:48
 "Michi" (Instrumental) – 4:40
 "Michi -Piano Version-" (Instrumental) – 4:49
  – 4:16
 "Gasshō Dō" (Instrumental) – 4:13

DVD 
 "Michi" (promotional video) – 4:54
 "Exile's Connection Information" (narrated by Kei Grant)

Personnel 
 ATSUSHI – vocals and chorus (tracks 1–4)
 TAKAHIRO – vocals and chorus (tracks 1–4)
 NHK Tokyo Children's Choir – vocals and chorus (tracks 5–6)
 Ritsuyūkai Youth Choir – vocals and chorus (tracks 5–6)
 Shogo Kashida – lyricist
 Miwa Furuse – composer
 Daisuke Kahara – arrangement, programming

References

External links 
 "Michi" entries on the Avex official website: CD+DVD edition entry, CD edition entry
 "Michi" entry on the Oricon Charts official website

Exile (Japanese band) songs
2007 singles
Oricon Weekly number-one singles
2007 songs
Rhythm Zone singles